The 2011 season was Gyeongnam FC's sixth season in the K-League in South Korea. Chunnam Dragons competed in K-League, League Cup and Korean FA Cup.

Current squad

Match results

K-League

League table

Results summary

Results by round

Korean FA Cup

League Cup

Squad statistics

Appearances and goals
Statistics accurate as of match played 30 October 2011

Top scorers

Top assistors

Discipline

Transfer

In
 1 July 2011 –  Jordán – Monagas Sport Club
 21 July 2011 –  Jung Dae-Sun – Ulsan Hyundai FC
 26 July 2011 –  Roni – São Paulo FC
 28 July 2011 –  Jeon Won-Keun – Daegu FC
 28 July 2011 –  Kang Seung-Jo – Jeonbuk Hyundai Motors
 21 September 2011 –  Cho Jae-Yong – Sangju Sangmu Phoenix

Out
 3 July 2011 –  Kim Young-Woo – Jeonbuk Hyundai Motors
 6 July 2011 –  Yoo Ji-Hoon – Busan I'Park
 7 July 2011 –  Ahn Hyun-Sik – Released (under indictment)
 7 July 2011 –  Park Chang-Heon – Released (under indictment)
 14 July 2011 –  Mauricio Mendoza – Released
 21 July 2011 –  Lúcio – Ulsan Hyundai FC
 28 July 2011 –  Kim You-Sung – Daegu FC

References

Gyeongnam FC
Gyeongnam FC seasons